The Swan 56 is a make and model of sailboats as designed by German Frers and built by Nautor's Swan and first launched in 1997. A number of version were done including a performance regatta version and some later boats featured a single aft cockpit.

External links
 Nautor Swan
 German Frers Official Website

References

 https://web.archive.org/web/20160818153827/http://www.nautorgroup.com/56_technical.htm

Sailing yachts
Keelboats
1990s sailboat type designs
Sailboat types built by Nautor Swan
Sailboat type designs by Germán Frers